Events from the year 1932 in Denmark.

Incumbents
 Monarch – Christian X
 Prime minister – Thorvald Stauning

Events
 July and August – Denmark participates in the 1932 Summer Olympics and wins 6 medals
 13 September – Danish Landsting election is held
 16 November – Danish Folketing election is held in Denmark, but not in Faroe Islands
 12 December – Danish Folketing election is held for the Faroe Islands
 10 August – The Lego Group is founded

Sports

Date unknown
 Kjøbenhavns Boldklub wins their seventh Danish football championship by winning the 1931–32 Danish Championship League.

Births

 11 March – Bodil Kjær, architect and furniture designer
 27 April – Arne Haugen Sørensen, artist
 13 July – Per Nørgård, composer
 20 July – Ove Verner Hansen, actor (died 2016)
 21 November – Pelle Gudmundsen-Holmgreen, composer (died 2016)

Deaths
 18 May – Christian Hedemann, photographer (born 1852)
 14 June – Peter Adler Alberti, politician and swindler, known for the Alberti scandal of 1908 (born 1851)

References

 
Denmark
Years of the 20th century in Denmark
1930s in Denmark
1932 in Europe